Simon Davis may refer to:

 Simon Davis (Australian cricketer) (born 1959), Australian cricketer
 Simon Davis (English cricketer) (born 1965), English cricketer
 Simon Davis (artist) (born 1968), British artist

See also
Simon Davies (disambiguation)
 List of people with surname Davis